Only Time: The Collection is a box set from Irish singer, songwriter and musician Enya, released in November 2002. The set contains 51 tracks across four discs that spans her 1987 debut album Enya through her 2002 single "May It Be". A 48-page booklet with liner notes and lyrics by her longtime lyricist Roma Ryan is included. The video of "Oíche Chiúin" is also included on the fourth disc, the performance comes from the BBC programme Christmas Day in the Morning (aired on 25 December 1996) and was recorded at Christ Church Cathedral in Dublin. In addition to this computer playable video, there is also a screensaver in the cover art motif and a slideshow of pictures from the booklet. This release was a limited worldwide release of 200,000, with US sales of over 60,000 copies. The selection of songs was made by Enya, Nicky and Roma.

Track listing

Disc 1

Disc 2

Disc 3

Notes
  misspelled as "After Ventus" in track listings

Disc 4

* Courtesy of BBC Television

Production
 All instruments and voices by Enya & performed by Enya, except "Storms in Africa": African Hand Drums by Chris Hughes, Hand Percussion by Nicky Ryan
 Music composed by Enya
 Lyrics by Roma Ryan, except "Marble Halls" (Traditional), "How Can I Keep from Singing?" (Traditional) and "Oíche Chiúin" (Traditional)
 Produced by Nicky Ryan
 Engineered by Nicky Ryan
 Arranged by Enya and Nicky Ryan
 Design and Art Direction by Stylorouge
 Photography by Simon Fowler at Syon House Middlesex
 Styling by Michele Clapton
 Hair and make-up by Aran Guest

Weekly charts

References

External links
 
 The Enya discography

Enya compilation albums
2002 compilation albums
Warner Music Group compilation albums